Hipponicidae, common name hoof shells or hoof snails, is a family of small sea snails, limpet-like marine gastropod molluscs in the superfamily Vanikoroidea.

Genera
Genera within the family Hipponicidae include:
Antisabia Iredale, 1937
Cheilea Modeer, 1793 – synonym: Mitrularia Schumacher, 1817
Hipponix DeFrance, 1819
Leptonotis Conrad, 1866
Malluvium Melvill, 1909
Milicheilea Espinosa & Ortea, 2011
Neojanacus Suter, 1907
Sabia Gray, 1841
Genera brought into synonymy
Amalthea Schumacher, 1817: synonym of Sabia Gray, 1841
Hipponyx Defrance, 1819: synonym of Hipponix Defrance, 1819
Mitrularia Schumacher, 1817: synonym of  Cheilea Modeer, 1793

References

 Vaught, K.C. (1989). A classification of the living Mollusca. American Malacologists: Melbourne, FL (USA). . XII, 195 pp
 Bouchet P. & Rocroi J.-P. (2005) Classification and nomenclator of gastropod families. Malacologia 47(1–2): 1–397.

External links 
 Powell A. W. B., New Zealand Mollusca, William Collins Publishers Ltd, Auckland, New Zealand 1979 

 
Vanikoroidea